Khadija Mastoor (11 December 192725 July 1982) was a Pakistani short story writer and novelist who worked in Urdu literature. Her novel Aangan is widely considered a literary masterpiece in Urdu literature, which has also been made into a television drama. Her younger sister Hajra Masroor was also a short story writer while poet, playwright and newspaper columnist Khalid Ahmad was her younger brother.

Early life

Khadija Mastoor was born on 11 December 1927 in Bareilly, India. She migrated to Lahore with her family after the independence of Pakistan in 1947 and settled there.

Literary career
Mastoor started writing short stories in 1942 and continued writing till her death. Five books of her short stories and two novels have been published. Her stories were based on social and moral values as well as political. Her writing was based on experience and observation.

Literary work

Novels 
  (1962)Winner of the Adamjee Literary Award. In 2010, on publishing Khadija Mastoor's novel Aangan, Chairman of Pakistan Academy of Letters, Fakhar Zaman said that the novel was one of her biggest literary achievements.
  (1983)

Short stories 
 Bochaar 1946 بوچھاڑ 
 Khail 1944  کھیل
 Chand Roz Oor 1951 چند روز اور

Other books 
 Thakay Haray 1962 
 Thanda Meetha Paani  1981 (winner of Hijra Award)

Personal life

She was married to journalist Malik Zaheer-ud-Deen Babar Awan and they had two children Kiran Fayyaz and Malik Pervez Alam Awan.

Death and legacy
Khadija Mastoor died on 25 July 1982 in London, England and was buried in Lahore, Pakistan.

In 2005, an event was arranged at the Karachi Arts Council where the chief guest was her sister Hajra Masroor, a noted writer herself. This event was presided over by another noted scholar Sahar Ansari. Ansari said that both sisters as writers established their own styles and traditions. He also said that Khadija Mastoor simply looked around and wrote down her experiences.

See also
 List of Pakistani writers
 List of Urdu language writers   
 List of people from Lahore

References

External links

 Herald exclusive: Lost in translation-II

1927 births
1982 deaths
Muhajir people
Pakistani feminist writers
Pakistani women short story writers
Writers from Lahore
People from Bareilly
Urdu-language novelists
20th-century novelists
Pakistani women novelists
Pakistani novelists
20th-century Pakistani women writers
20th-century Pakistani short story writers
Recipients of the Adamjee Literary Award